François Piétri (8 August 1882 – 17 August 1966) was a minister in several governments in the later years of the French Third Republic and was French ambassador to Spain from 1940 to 1944 under the Vichy regime.

Born in Bastia, Corsica to Antoine-Jourdan Piétri, a lawyer and préfecture councilman, and Clorinde Gavini, the daughter of a French National Assembly member. Piétri graduated from Collège Stanislas in 1899 and moved on to the École libre des sciences politiques for his university education.  He was selected for the French Civil Service in 1906 as an auditor (Inspecteur des finances) and progressed through the ranks to the post of Directeur général des finances du Maroc - Director of Finances for Morocco - a role he filled from 1917 to 1924.  

In 1924, Piétri was elected to the National Assembly and remained in office there until 1942.  During that time, he occupied a number of responsibilities, including:
 Undersecretary of State for Finance (Sous-secrétaire d'État aux finances)  in 1926
 Minister for Colonial Affairs (Ministre des colonies) in 1929–1930 and again in 1933
 Minister of the Budget  (Ministre du budget) in 1931–1932
 Defense Minister (Ministre de la défense nationale) in 1932
 Finance Minister (Ministre des finances) for just one week in early 1934
 Minister of Merchant Marine 1–7 June 1935
 Naval Minister (Ministre de la marine) in 1934–1936
 Minister of Posts, Telegraphs, and Telephones briefly in 1940 after the German invasion.

He remained involved in French politics during the Nazi occupation of France, becoming the Vichy ambassador to Spain from 1940 to 1944.

François Piétri died in 1966 in Ajaccio.

References

External links
 François Piétri at the French Ministry of Finance website (in French)
 Piétri, François - Mes années d'Espagne - 1940-1948 - Librairie Plon, January 1954
 A funeral oration by the vice-president of the International Olympic Committee (Comité International Olympique - CIO)

1882 births
1966 deaths
People from Bastia
Corsican politicians
Democratic Republican Alliance politicians
Ministers of Marine
French Ministers of Budget
French Ministers of Posts, Telegraphs, and Telephones
French Ministers of Overseas France
French Ministers of Finance
French Ministers of Merchant Marine
French Ministers of Defence
Members of the 13th Chamber of Deputies of the French Third Republic
Members of the 14th Chamber of Deputies of the French Third Republic
Members of the 15th Chamber of Deputies of the French Third Republic
Members of the 16th Chamber of Deputies of the French Third Republic
People of Vichy France
Collège Stanislas de Paris alumni